The genus Basella is the type genus of the plant family Basellaceae.  Basella contains five known species. Three species are endemic to Madagascar, and one is endemic to southeastern Africa. The fifth is widespread across Southeast Asia, the Indian Subcontinent, and New Guinea.

The genus name is derived from the south Indian name Basale which Hendrik Rheede recorded in Malabar as Basella in his Hortus Malabaricus. The name was utilitized by Linnaeus.

Species

 Basella alba L. - Indian Subcontinent, Indochina, Malaysia, Indonesia, Philippines, New Guinea; naturalized in Africa, southern China, Central America, and various oceanic islands
 Basella excavata Scott-Elliot  - Madagascar
 Basella leandriana H.Perrier    - Madagascar
 Basella madagascariensis Boivin ex. H.Perrier - Madagascar
 Basella paniculata Volkens - Kenya, Tanzania, Mozambique, Transvaal, Kwazulu-Natal

References

External links
Basella alba in BoDD – Botanical Dermatology Database

Basellaceae
Caryophyllales genera